Murdochella alacer is a species of minute wentletrap, a sea snail, a marine gastropod mollusk or micromollusk in the family Nystiellidae, commonly known as wentletraps, found in New Zealand.

References

Nystiellidae
Gastropods described in 1927
Taxa named by Harold John Finlay